The División de Honor Femenina 2013–14 was the 57th season of women's handball top flight in Spain since its establishment. Itxako, four times champion, were the defending champion but the club was disbanded during 2013's summer. The season began on 13 September, 2013 and the last matchday was played on 17 May, 2014. A total of 14 teams took part the league, 11 of which had already contested in the 2012–13 season, 1 new created team and two of which were promoted from the División de Plata 2012–13.

Bera Bera won its second title in a row. Bera Bera won the championship on 10 May with one matchday remaining left to play. Further, regarding to European competitions for next season; Bera Bera (originally qualified for EHF Champions League although later declined to take part in the competition due to financial constraints) and Rocasa ACE G.C. qualified to 2014–15 EHF Cup and Mecalia Atlético Guardés to EHF Cup Winners' Cup.

Promotion and relegation 
Teams promoted from 2012–13 División de Plata
Adesal Córdoba
Aula Cultural Viveros Herol

Teams relegated to 2014–15 División de Plata
Mar Alicante
Kukullaga Etxebarri

New team
Canyamelar Valencia

Teams

Final standings

Top goalscorers

See also
Liga ASOBAL 2013–14

References

External links
Royal Spanish Handball Federation

División de Honor Femenina de Balonmano seasons
Division de Honor
2013–14 domestic handball leagues
2013 in women's handball
2014 in women's handball